This is a list of notable salespeople in fictional contexts.

 Harry "Rabbit" Angstrom, in the John Updike novels Rabbit, Run and sequels
 Al Bundy, shoe salesman on the U.S. television series Married... with Children
 George Babbitt, in the Sinclair Lewis novel Babbitt
 Andy Bernard, on the television series, The Office
 Rodney Blackstock, on the soap opera, Emmerdale
 Tim Canterbury, on the television series, The Office
 John Casey, on the television series, Chuck
 Brett Craig, on the television series, Kath & Kim
 Larry Dallas, used car salesman on the sitcom Three's Company
 C.M.O.T. Dibbler, in Terry Pratchett's Discworld series
 Santo DiMera, in the soap opera Days of Our Lives
 Terry Duckworth, in the soap opera Coronation Street
 Montague Egg, wine salesman, in short stories by Dorothy L. Sayers
 Jim Halpert, paper salesman in The Office
 Harold Hill, in The Music Man
 Audrey Horne, in Twin Peaks
 Gareth Keenan, paper salesman in British television series The Office
 Daniel LaRusso, car salesman in The Karate Kid and Cobra Kai
 Malcolm Kennedy, on the soap opera Neighbours 
 Leisure Suit Larry, eponymous video game character
 Willy Loman, in Arthur Miller's Death of a Salesman
 Darren Miller, on the soap opera EastEnders 
 Gregor Samsa, in Franz Kafka's The Metamorphosis
 Dwight Schrute, in The Office
 Jolyon Wagg, annoying insurance salesman in The Adventures of Tintin
 Ash Williams, in the franchise The Evil Dead
 Derek Wilton, on the soap opera Coronation Street
 Spamton G. Spamton, failed salesman in the video game Deltarune

 
salespeople